Peter Berry may refer to:

 Peter Berry (basketball), American wheelchair basketball player
 Peter Berry (priest) (1935–2018), Provost of Birmingham Cathedral
 Peter Berry (footballer) (1933–2016), English footballer

See also 
 Peter Barry (disambiguation)